The Twelve is a 2019 Flemish-language television series created by Sanne Nuyens and Bert Van Dael and starring Maaike Cafmeyer, Charlotte De Bruyne, Tom Vermeir and Maaike Neuville.

Cast 
 Maaike Neuville as Delphine Spijkers, one of the jurors
 Charlotte De Bruyne as Holly Ceusters, one of the jurors
 Tom Vermeir as Joeri Cornille, one of the jurors
 Peter Gorissen as Arnold Briers, one of the jurors
Zouzou Ben Chikha as Carl Destoop, one of the jurors, who is autistic.
 Piet De Praitere as Noël Marinus, one of the jurors
 Maaike Cafmeyer as Frie Palmers, the defendant. Louise DeBisscop plays the younger Frie.
 Anne-Mieke Ruyten as Vera De Block, one of the jurors
 Josse De Pauw as Ari Spaak, Frie's lawyer
Johan Heldenbergh as Stefaan De Munck, Frie's ex-husband. Aimé Claeys plays the younger Stefaan.
Greet Verstraete as Margot Tindemans, Stefaan's wife
Koen De Sutter as Marc Vindevogel, Brechtje's father
Sophie Decleir as Inge Van Severen, Marc's lawyer
 Mieke De Groote as Mia, president of the court of assizes
 Isabelle van Hecke as Hedwig, the crown prosecutor
Mungu Cornelis as Fabrice Boks, a TV reporter

Supporting cast 

 Nele Bauwens as Tessa, Carl's wife
 William Boeva as William, Arnold's neighbour
 Spencer Bogart as Davy, Juliette's friend
 Souad Boukhatem as Naïma
 Bart Claeys as Bob, one of the jurors
 Lore Dejonckheere as Leentje, one of the jurors
 Jolente De Keersmaeker as Lutgard, Margot's mother
 Ilse de Koe as Elisabeth Vergote, a cinema employee
 Aminata Demba as Ari's assistant
Luc De Ruelle as assize messenger
 Gilles De Schryver as Michiel, Holly's friend
 Jane Desmet as Mireille, Arnold's colleague
Titus De Voogdt as Mike, Delphine's husband
 Sofia Ferry as Juliette Destoop, Carl's autistic daughter
 Sachli Gholamalizad as Cleo Mahieu, a law doctor
 Veerle Malschaert as Yannick, one of the jurors
 Emin Mektepli as Demir Karaca, one of the jurors
 Bart Slegers as Donald Vantomme, a police inspector
 Dominique Van Malder as Björn Cornille, Joeri's brother
 Lino Van Reeth as Kurt, one of the jurors
 Lynn Van Royen as Brechtje Vindevogel, Frie's friend who she is accused of murdering in 2000.
 Ronny Waterschoot as Joeri and Björn's father
 Frank Vercruyssen as Ulrich Steel, Brechtje's teacher
 Bram Verrecas as Ward, one of the jurors
 Sarah Vertongen as Eliane Pascual, a police inspector
 William Willaert as Guy Vanneste, a livestock trader

Plot

Twelve citizens are called for jury duty in an unusual murder case:  Frie Palmers is a school headmistress accused of two murders committed many years apart. The first is the murder of her best friend Brechtje on New Years Day 2000, and the second is the killing of her own daughter in 2016. As the trial progresses, each jury member has varied emotional reactions to the events of the case as presented by the prosecutor. It is their difficult job to decide on the guilt or the innocence of the accused.

Release 
The Twelve was released on November 3, 2019 on Eén. Netflix picked up the series for streaming in July 2020. In the UK, the series was licensed by Channel 4 as part of its Walter Presents service and is available to stream on All 4.

Music 
The soundtrack of this series is written by David Martijn and Jeroen Swinnen.

Australian adaptation 

De Twaalf was adapted for Australian television, and aired on Foxtel's Fox Showcase from June to August 2022. It features Kate Mulvany, Sam Neill, Marta Dusseldorp and Brendan Cowell. The writing team for the adaptation consisted of Sarah Walker, Bradford Winters, Leah Purcell, Anchuli Felicia King, Tommy Murphy and Greg Waters.

References

External links
 
 

Serial drama television series
2019 Belgian television series debuts
2010s Belgian television series
Dutch-language television shows
Eén original programming
Belgian drama television shows
Autism in television